Lakshmipolavaram is a village in Ravulapalem Mandal, Dr. B.R. Ambedkar Konaseema district in the state of Andhra Pradesh in India.

Geography 

Demographics 
 India census, Lakshmipolavaram had a population of 8,042, out of which 4,025 were male and 4,017 were female. The population of children below 6 years of age was 10%. The literacy rate of the village was 71%.

References 

Villages in Ravulapalem mandal